Balanta may refer to:

Surname
 Ángelo Balanta, Colombian footballer
 Deivy Balanta, Colombian footballer
 Éder Álvarez Balanta, Colombian footballer
 Kevin Balanta, Colombian footballer
 Leyvin Balanta, Colombian footballer

Ethnic groups
 Balanta people, West African ethnic group
 Balanta language, spoken in West Africa

Other
 Balanţa, Romanian film known in English as The Oak